Tone Tingsgård (born 1944) is a Swedish social democratic politician. She was a member of the Riksdag from 2002 to 2010.

External links
Tone Tingsgård at the Riksdag website

Members of the Riksdag from the Social Democrats
Living people
1944 births
Women members of the Riksdag
Members of the Riksdag 2002–2006
21st-century Swedish women politicians
Members of the Riksdag 2006–2010